Catastrophe bonds (also known as cat bonds) are risk-linked securities that transfer a specified set of risks from a sponsor to investors.  They were created and first used in the mid-1990s in the aftermath of Hurricane Andrew and the Northridge earthquake.

Catastrophe bonds emerged from a need by insurance companies to alleviate some of the risks they would face if a major catastrophe occurred, which would incur damages that they could not cover by the invested premiums. An insurance company issues bonds through an investment bank, which are then sold to investors.  These bonds are inherently risky, generally BB, and usually have maturities less than 3 years.  If no catastrophe occurred, the insurance company would pay a coupon to the investors.  But if a catastrophe did occur, then the principal would be forgiven and the insurance company would use this money to pay their claim-holders.  Investors include hedge funds, catastrophe-oriented funds, and asset managers. They are often structured as floating-rate bonds whose principal is lost if specified trigger conditions are met.  If triggered the principal is paid to the sponsor. The triggers are linked to major natural catastrophes.  Catastrophe bonds are typically used by insurers as an alternative to traditional catastrophe reinsurance.

For example, if an insurer has built up a portfolio of risks by insuring properties in Florida, then it might wish to pass some of this risk on so that it can remain solvent after a large hurricane.  It could simply purchase traditional catastrophe reinsurance, which would pass the risk on to reinsurers.  Or it could sponsor a cat bond, which would pass the risk on to investors.  In consultation with an investment bank, it would create a special purpose entity that would issue the cat bond.  Investors would buy the bond, which might pay them a coupon of LIBOR plus a spread, generally (but not always) between 3 and 20%.  If no hurricane hit Florida, then the investors would make a positive return on their investment.  But if a hurricane were to hit Florida and trigger the cat bond, then the principal initially contributed by the investors would be transferred to the sponsor to pay its claims to policyholders. The bond would technically be in default and be a loss to investors.

Michael Moriarty, Deputy Superintendent of the New York State Insurance Department, has been at the forefront of state regulatory efforts to have U.S. regulators encourage the development of insurance securitizations through cat bonds in the United States instead of off-shore, through encouraging two different methods—protected cells and special purpose reinsurance vehicles.  In August 2007 Michael Lewis, the author of Liar's Poker and Moneyball, wrote an article about catastrophe bonds that appeared in The New York Times Magazine, titled "In Nature's Casino."

History

The notion of securitizing catastrophe risks became prominent in the aftermath of Hurricane Andrew, notably in work published by Richard Sandor, Kenneth Froot, and a group of professors at the Wharton School who were seeking vehicles to bring more risk-bearing capacity to the catastrophe reinsurance market.  The first experimental transactions were completed in the mid-1990s by AIG, Hannover Re, St. Paul Re, and USAA.

The market grew to $1–2 billion of issuance per year for the 1998–2001 period, and over $2 billion per year following 9/11.  Issuance doubled again to a run rate of approximately $4 billion on an annual basis in 2006 following Hurricane Katrina, and was accompanied by the development of reinsurance sidecars.  Issuance continued to increase through 2007, despite the passing of the post-Katrina "hard market", as a number of insurers sought diversification of coverage through the market, including State Farm, Allstate, Liberty Mutual, Chubb, and Travelers, along with long-time issuer USAA.  Total issuance exceeded $4 billion in the second quarter of 2007 alone.

It is also possible to adapt these instruments to other contexts. Citigroup developed the Stability Note in 2003, which protects the issuer against catastrophic stock market crashes; it was later adapted to protect against hedge fund collapses. Professor Lawrence A. Cunningham of George Washington University suggests adapting cat bonds to the risks that large auditing firms face in cases asserting massive securities law damages.  Other innovative uses of cat bond structures have been proposed as well.

Investors

Investors choose to invest in catastrophe bonds because their return is largely uncorrelated with the return on other investments in fixed income or in equities, so cat bonds help investors achieve diversification.  Investors also buy these securities because they generally pay higher interest rates (in terms of spreads over funding rates) than comparably rated corporate instruments, as long as they are not triggered.

Key categories of investors who participate in this market include hedge funds, specialized catastrophe-oriented funds, and asset managers.  Life insurers, reinsurers, banks, pension funds, and other investors have also participated in offerings.

A number of specialized catastrophe-oriented funds play a significant role in the sector, including Twelve Capital, Credit Suisse, Juniperus Capital, Coriolis Capital, AXA Investment Managers, Plenum Investments and Clariden Leu.  Several mutual fund and hedge fund managers also invest in catastrophe bonds, among them Oppenheimer Funds, TIAA-Cref, Pine River Capital, and PIMCO.

Ratings

Cat bonds are often rated by an agency such as Standard & Poor's, Moody's, or Fitch Ratings.  A typical corporate bond is rated based on its probability of default due to the issuer going into bankruptcy.  A catastrophe bond is rated based on its probability of default due to a qualifying catastrophe triggering loss of principal.  This probability is determined with the use of catastrophe models.  Most catastrophe bonds are rated below investment grade (BB and B category ratings), and the various rating agencies have recently moved toward a view that securities must require multiple events before an occurrence of a loss in order to be rated investment grade.

Structure
Most catastrophe bonds are issued by special purpose reinsurance companies domiciled in the Cayman Islands, Bermuda, or Ireland.  These companies typically participate in one or more reinsurance treaties to protect buyers, most commonly insurers (called "cedants") or reinsurers (called "retrocedents").  This contract may be structured as a derivative in cases in which it is "triggered" by one or more indices or event parameters (see below), rather than losses of the cedant or retrocedent.

Some bonds cover the risk that multiple losses will occur.  The first-second event bond (Atlas Re) was issued in 1999.  The first third event bond (Atlas II) was issued in 2001.  Subsequently, bonds triggered by fourth through ninth losses have been issued, including Avalon, Bay Haven, and Fremantle, each of which apply tranching technology to baskets of underlying events.  The first actively managed pool of bonds and other contracts ("Catastrophe CDO") called Gamut was issued in 2007, with Nephila as the asset manager.

Trigger types

The sponsor and investment bank who structure the cat bond must choose how the principal impairment is triggered.  Cat bonds can be categorized into four basic trigger types.  The trigger types listed first are more correlated to the actual losses of the insurer sponsoring the cat bond.  The trigger types listed farther down the list are not as highly correlated to the insurer's actual losses, so the cat bond has to be structured carefully and properly calibrated, but investors would not have to worry about the insurer's claims adjustment practices.

Indemnity: triggered by the issuer's actual losses, so the sponsor is indemnified, as if they had purchased traditional catastrophe reinsurance.  If the layer specified in the cat bond is $100 million excess of $500 million, and the total claims add up to more than $500 million, then the bond is triggered.

Modeled loss: instead of dealing with the company's actual claims, an exposure portfolio is constructed for use with catastrophe modeling software, and then when there is a large event, the event parameters are run against the exposure database in the cat model.  If the modeled losses are above a specified threshold, the bond is triggered.

Indexed to industry loss: instead of adding up the insurer's claims, the cat bond is triggered when the insurance industry loss from a certain peril reaches a specified threshold, say $30 billion.  The cat bond will specify who determines the industry loss; typically it is a recognized agency like PCS. "Modified index" linked securities customize the index to a company's own book of business by weighting the index results for various territories and lines of business.

Parametric: instead of being based on any claims (the insurer's actual claims, the modeled claims, or the industry's claims), the trigger is indexed to the natural hazard caused by nature.  So the parameter would be the windspeed (for a hurricane bond), the ground acceleration (for an earthquake bond), or whatever is appropriate for the peril.  Data for this parameter is collected at multiple reporting stations and then entered into specified formulae.  For example, if a typhoon generates windspeeds greater than X meters per second at 50 of the 150 weather observation stations of the Japanese Meteorological Agency, the cat bond is triggered.

Parametric Index: Many firms are uncomfortable with pure parametric bonds due to the lack of correlation with actual loss. For instance, a bond may pay out based on the wind speed at 50 of the 150 stations mentioned above, but the insurer loses very little money because a majority of their exposure is concentrated in other locations. Models can give an approximation of loss as a function of the speed at differing locations, which are then used to give a payout function for the bond. These function as hybrid Parametric / Modeled loss bonds, and have lowered basis risk as well as more transparency.

Market participants

Examples of cat bond sponsors include insurers, reinsurers, corporations, and government agencies.  Over time, frequent issuers have included USAA, Scor SE, Swiss Re, Munich Re, Liberty Mutual, Hannover Re, Allianz, and Tokio Marine Nichido. Mexico is the only national sovereign to have issued cat bonds (in 2006, for hedging earthquake risk and in 2009 and 2012, a multi structure instrument that covered earthquake and hurricane risk). In June 2014, the World Bank issued its first catastrophe bond linked to natural hazard (tropical cyclone and earthquake) risks in sixteen Caribbean countries, and in 2017 it launched the Pandemic Emergency Financing Facility to provide funding in case of pandemic disease.

To date, all direct catastrophe bond investors have been institutional investors, since all broadly distributed transactions have been distributed in that form.  These have included specialized catastrophe bond funds, hedge funds, investment advisors (money managers), life insurers, reinsurers, pension funds, and others.  Individual investors have generally purchased such securities through specialized funds.

Investment banks and Inter Dealer Brokers that are active in the trading and issuance of catastrophe bonds include Aon Securities Inc., BNP Paribas, Deutsche Bank, Swiss Re Capital Markets, GC Securities (a division of MMC Securities Corp. and affiliate of Guy Carpenter), Goldman Sachs, Rewire Securities, Munich Re Capital Markets, Jardine Lloyd Thompson Capital Markets and Willis Capital Markets.  Some of them also make secondary markets in these bonds.

Patents

There are a number of issued US patents and pending US patent applications related to catastrophe bonds.

See also

 Insurance-Linked Securities (ILS)
 Catastrophe modeling
 Fixed income
 Reinsurance
 Risk management
 Reinsurance sidecar
 Alternative risk transfer

References

External links
 Artemis Catastrophe Bond Deal Directory – list of all major cat bond deals
 "In Nature's Casino" (by Michael Lewis), New York Times Magazine, 8/26/07
 Cat Bond Pricing Using Probability Transforms (by Shaun S. Wang)
 Financial Innovations in Insurance – Panel Discussion in New York, January 2008

Bonds (finance)
Offshore finance
Types of insurance
Reinsurance